Carlos Fumo Gonçalves (born 22 September 1979 in Maputo) is a Mozambican retired footballer who played as a left winger.

External links

1979 births
Living people
Sportspeople from Maputo
Mozambican footballers
Association football wingers
Primeira Liga players
Liga Portugal 2 players
Sporting CP footballers
F.C. Maia players
Varzim S.C. players
S.C. Farense players
Associação Naval 1º de Maio players
F.C. Alverca players
Gondomar S.C. players
Gil Vicente F.C. players
S.C. Olhanense players
Cypriot First Division players
Cypriot Second Division players
Atromitos Yeroskipou players
APEP FC players
Olympiakos Nicosia players
Akritas Chlorakas players
CD Matchedje de Maputo players
GD da Companhia Têxtil do Punguè players
Mozambique international footballers
2010 Africa Cup of Nations players
Mozambican expatriate footballers
Expatriate footballers in Portugal
Expatriate footballers in Cyprus
Mozambican expatriate sportspeople in Portugal
Mozambican expatriate sportspeople in Cyprus